Elena Voloshanka Stefanovna of Moldavia (Elena of Wallachia, ; 1465–1505), was a Moldavian royal and daughter of Stephen III, who became Crown Princess of Grand Duchy of Moscow by her marriage to Ivan the Young.

Elena married Ivan the Young in 1483, giving birth to Prince Dmitry Ivanovich. After the death of her spouse in 1490, her son was appointed the next heir to the throne. She actively participated in politics at court to protect her son's interests and rights to succession against Sophia Palaiologina, the stepmother of her late spouse, who wished for her son to be appointed heir. In 1502, the Sophia faction defeated the Elena faction and Elena and her son were imprisoned. She was poisoned in prison in 1505.

References

  Мохов Н. А. Молдавия эпохи феодализма. — Кишинёв: Картя Молдовеняскэ, 1964. — С. 196–197.

1505 deaths
1465 births
16th-century nobility
15th-century nobility
16th-century Russian people
15th-century Russian people
16th-century Russian women
15th-century Russian women
16th-century Romanian people
15th-century Romanian people
16th-century Romanian women
15th-century Romanian women
Russian royal consorts
House of Bogdan-Mușat
People of the Grand Duchy of Moscow
Romanian expatriates in Russia
Romanian people imprisoned abroad
Russian prisoners and detainees
Prisoners and detainees of Russia
Deaths by poisoning
Assassinated royalty